KMOB-LP (100.3 FM) is a radio station broadcasting an urban music format. Licensed to Clearlake, California, United States, the station serves the Clearlake-Ukiah area. The station is currently owned by Minds of Business Inc.

References

External links
 
 

MOB-LP
Urban contemporary radio stations in the United States
MOB-LP